Goudurix is a steel roller coaster located in Parc Astérix in France. The Vekoma-built ride jointly held the European record for the greatest number of inversions upon its opening in 1989. The record was lost in 1995 to Dragon Khan in Spain. It is one of only two coasters in the world to feature a butterfly element (the other being Blue Hawk at Six Flags Over Georgia). In 2007, following the release of the animated movie Asterix and the Vikings, Viking theming was added to the station and nearby rides, in the form of a wooden Viking longboat. Goudurix is located in the back-west of the park (southeast geographically, since park entrance faces south), near the Tonnerre 2 Zeus. The ride was repainted to a yellow and red track with grey supports color scheme from its previous white and yellow track with blue supports. It is one of the park's main attractions, along with the Tonnerre 2 Zeus, OzIris and Trace du Hourra rollercoasters.

Previously known for its extraordinarily rough ride which was exacerbated by improperly-designed headrests and unnecessarily hard over-the-shoulder restraints, Goudurix was ranked as the worst steel roller coaster in the world in the 2012 Mitch Hawker Steel Coaster Poll. In response to this, it has seen numerous modifications, including new cars/trains and a complete re-tracking to improve the smoothness of the ride.

Ride elements
Goudurix has seven inversions in total:

Batwing (2 inversions 1 element)
Butterfly (2 inversions 1 element)
Vertical Loop
Double Corkscrew

History
Goudurix has seen many changes of its track, electrical systems and theme since its creation.
1988 : Goudurix built by Vekoma with known problems (such as violent turns)
2000 : Trains are changed and a few different wheels are tested in order to improve the ride comfort
2007 : Total recovery of electrical device
2007 : Theming added to the station
2009 : The whole track is entirely repainted in red and yellow (instead of white and blue)
2010 : A part of the trains are changed, making them heavier
2011 : Test with new wheels to reduce vibrations
2013 : Retracking

References

Roller coasters in France
Roller coasters introduced in 1989
Bandes dessinées in amusement parks